Dmitriy Valentinovich Bashkevich (born 26 February 1968 in Tashkent) is a retired Uzbekistani football goalkeeper of Russian descent who played for Uzbekistani national team in the 1996 Asian Cup. He also played for Spartak Semipalatinsk, Khimik Dzhamboul, Navbahor Namangan and Kuban Krasnodar.

External links
 

1968 births
Living people
Sportspeople from Tashkent
Soviet footballers
Uzbekistani footballers
Association football goalkeepers
Uzbekistani people of Russian descent
Uzbekistan international footballers
1996 AFC Asian Cup players
Russian Premier League players
Expatriate footballers in Russia
Uzbekistani expatriate footballers
Uzbekistani expatriate sportspeople in Russia
FC Kuban Krasnodar players
Navbahor Namangan players
FC Taraz players
FC Spartak Semey players